Pierre Cornud (born 12 December 1996) is a French professional footballer who plays as a left-back for Israeli club Maccabi Haifa, on loan from Spanish club Real Oviedo.

Club career
Born in Avignon, Cornud was a Montpellier HSC youth graduate, and made his senior debut with the reserves in the 2014–15 season, suffering relegation from the Championnat de France Amateur. In 2016 he moved to Dijon FCO, appearing almost exclusively with the B-side; his only match for the main squad occurred on 27 July 2016, in a friendly against Sunderland.

On 11 August 2017, Cornud signed a three-year contract with RCD Mallorca, after impressing in a trial basis; he was initially assigned to the B-team in Tercera División. On 6 July of the following year, he was loaned to Segunda División B side Real Balompédica Linense as a part of Stoichkov's transfer.

On 30 August 2019, Cornud moved to another reserve team, Real Oviedo Vetusta on loan for the 2019–20 campaign. The following 29 January, he left the club and moved to fellow third tier team UD Ibiza, also in a temporary deal.

On 14 August 2020, Cornud agreed to a permanent deal with CE Sabadell FC, newly promoted to Segunda División. He made his professional debut on 19 September, starting in a 2–1 away loss against Rayo Vallecano.

On 2 July 2021, after Sabadell's relegation, Cornud signed a two-year contract with Real Oviedo also in the second tier.

References

External links

1996 births
Living people
Sportspeople from Avignon
French footballers
Association football defenders
Montpellier HSC players
Dijon FCO players
RCD Mallorca B players
RCD Mallorca players
Real Balompédica Linense footballers
Real Oviedo Vetusta players
UD Ibiza players
CE Sabadell FC footballers
Real Oviedo players
Maccabi Haifa F.C. players
Championnat National 2 players
Championnat National 3 players
Segunda División players
Segunda División B players
Tercera División players
Israeli Premier League players
French expatriate footballers
Expatriate footballers in Spain
Expatriate footballers in Israel
French expatriate sportspeople in Spain
French expatriate sportspeople in Israel
Footballers from Provence-Alpes-Côte d'Azur